Nemapogon grossi is a moth of the family Tineidae. It is found in Turkey.

The wingspan is about 15 mm. The forewings are whitish, with a brown pattern. The hindwings are shining whitish.

Etymology
The species is named in honour of Franz Joseph Groß, who collected the species.

References

Moths described in 2007
Nemapogoninae